Uhtju islands (Estonian: Uhtju saared) is a group of islands belonging to the country of Estonia.

Uhtju islands are Uhtju island (Põhja-Uhtju) and Sala island (Lõuna-Uhtju).

See also
 List of islands of Estonia

Islands of Estonia
Haljala Parish